The 2012–13 Umbro FAI Intermediate Cup was the 86th season of the tournament's existence. 94 clubs competed to win the title. Avondale United are the defending champions after they beat Cherry Orchard 2-1 for the second successive season in the final after extra time in Tallaght Stadium to gain their fifth Intermediate Cup title. The 16 teams that reach the fourth round will qualify for the 2013 FAI Cup.

First round
Intermediate teams from the Leinster Senior League, Munster Senior League and Ulster Senior League enter at this stage. In this round teams from the Leinster Senior League play each other, teams from the Munster Senior League play each other, and teams from the Ulster Senior League play each other. The draw was made on 4 September 2012 with ties to be played on the weekend of 30 September 2012. Extra-time and penalties will be played if necessary.

Ulster

Byes:
 Bonagee United
 Buncrana Hearts
 Drumkeen United
 Swilly Rovers

Munster

Byes:
 Ballincollig
 Bandon
 Blarney United
 Castleview
 Crosshaven
 Kinsale
 Leeside
 Mayfield United
 Midleton
 Ringmahon Rangers
 St. Mary's
 Tramore Athletic
 Youghal United

Leinster

Byes:
 Broadford Rovers
 Celbridge Town
 Confey
 Crumlin United
 Glenmore Dundrum
 Killester United
 Kilmanagh
 Leixlip United
 Newbridge Town
 Parkvilla
 Rathcoole Boys
 Ratoath Harps
 St. James Gate
 St. Mochtas
 Tymon Celtic
 Verona

Second round
In this round teams from the winners of the first round from the Leinster Senior League play each other, Munster Senior League play each other, and teams from the Ulster Senior League play each other. The draw was made on 3 October 2012 with ties to be played on the weekend of 28 October 2012. Extra-time and penalties will be played if necessary.

Ulster

Munster

Leinster

* The match was abandoned when a Lucan United player was seriously injured. Greystones United were leading 2-1 at the time.

Third round
The draw for this round was made on 6 November 2012 by the FAI Domestic Committee. Ties are to be played on the weekend on 2 December. In this round teams from the Leinster Senior League, Munster Senior League, Ulster Senior League play each other. The  16 winners of the Third Round ties will progress to the Fourth Round and also qualify for the 2013 FAI Cup. If ties end in a draw after 90 minutes, a replay will be played in which the away side from the first match will have home advantage. In the replay if it remains a draw, extra-time will be played and if required, penalties.

Fourth round
The draw for this round was made on 4 December 2012 by the FAI Domestic Committee. The teams that have made it to the Fourth Round have qualified for the 2013 FAI Cup. If ties end in a draw after 90 minutes, a replay will be played in which the away side from the first match will have home advantage. In the replay if it remains a draw, extra-time will be played and if required, penalties. Parkvilla are the lowest ranked team remaining in the competition, playing in the 4th tier of the Leinster Senior League.

 Replay played in Irishtown Stadium as Bangor Celtic's pitch at Iveagh Grounds was unplayable.

Quarter-final
The draw for this round was made on 5 February 2013 by the FAI Domestic Committee. If ties end in a draw after 90 minutes, a replay will be played in which the away side from the first match will have home advantage. In the replay if it remains a draw after 90 minutes, extra-time will be played and if required, penalties. Parkvilla are the lowest ranked team remaining in the competition, playing in the 4th tier of the Leinster Senior League.

Semi-final
The draw for the semi finals were made on 5 March 2013 by the FAI Domestic Committee in the FAI Headquarters, Abbotstown . If ties end in a draw after 90 minutes, a replay will be played in which the away side from the first match will have home advantage. In the replay if it remains a draw after 90 minutes, extra-time will be played and if required, penalties.

Final

References

5
5
Ireland
FAI Intermediate Cup